The First Gerbrandy cabinet, also called the Second London cabinet was the executive branch of the Dutch government-in-exile from 3 September 1940 until 27 July 1941. The War cabinet was formed by the christian-democratic Roman Catholic State Party (RKSP), Anti-Revolutionary Party (ARP) and Christian Historical Union (CHU), the social-democratic Social Democratic Workers' Party (SDAP), the social-liberal Free-thinking Democratic League (VBD) and the conservative-liberal Liberal State Party (LSP) after the resignation of the previous Cabinet De Geer II. The national unity government (War cabinet) was the second of four war cabinets of the government-in-exile in London during World War II.

Formation
On 26 August 1940 Queen Wilhelmina dismissed the Second De Geer cabinet after she lost confidence in the ability of Prime Minister Dirk Jan de Geer to govern after the German Invasion on 10 May 1940. Subsequently on 28 August 1940 Queen Wilhelmina appointed Minister of Justice Pieter Sjoerds Gerbrandy (ARP) as Formateur to form a new cabinet. On 3 September 1940 the formation of the war cabinet  was completed and Pieter Sjoerds Gerbrandy was installed as Prime Minister. All ministers of the previous Second De Geer cabinet (excluding Prime Minister Dirk Jan de Geer) where retained, with Minister of Colonial Affairs Charles Welter (RKSP) taking over as Minister of Finance from Dirk Jan de Geer.

Term
The cabinet fell on 12 June 1941 after a conflict between Queen Wilhelmina and Minister of Defence Adriaan Dijxhoorn, leading to the dismissal of the minister. Immediately also the other ministers resigned and the cabinet continued for five weeks as a demissionary cabinet until the ministries were redistributed and the Second Gerbrandy cabinet was installed on 27 July 1941.

Changes
On 1 May 1941 Minister of Agriculture and Fisheries Aat van Rhijn (CHU) was appointed as a Member of the Court of Audits. Because there was little work in the Ministry of Agriculture and Fisheries while the government-in-exile was in London the portfolio was combined with the Minister of Commerce, Industry and Shipping Max Steenberghe (RKSP).

Cabinet Members

References

External links
Official

  Kabinet-Gerbrandy I en II Parlement & Politiek

Cabinets of the Netherlands
1940 establishments in the Netherlands
1941 disestablishments in the Netherlands
Cabinets established in 1940
Cabinets disestablished in 1941
Netherlands in World War II
Governments in exile during World War II